A Drug Recognition Expert (DRE) is a law enforcement officer trained in a scientifically validated method to identify people whose driving is impaired by drugs other than, or in addition to, alcohol.
All DREs follow the same 12 step procedure called a Drug Influence Evaluation (DIE), to purportedly determine which category of drugs is causing the driver to be impaired.

If a DRE determines that a driver was too impaired to operate a vehicle in a safe manner, they will look for indications of the drugs suspected, by the common perceivable effects the drugs have on the human body. There are seven categories of classifications a DRE is looking for, including; central nervous system depressants, CNS stimulants, dissociative anesthetics, cannabis, hallucinogens, inhalants, and narcotic analgesics.

DREs often testify in court, where the term "expert" has important legal implications. The Traffic Resource for Judges   describes different approaches taken by state courts in how DRE evidence is admitted.  

The acronym 'DRE' has been used to refer not just to the DRE officers, but also to the examination they perform, the "Drug Recognition Examination", or "Drug Recognition Evaluation." The confluence of acronyms leads to confusion, and the IACP now calls the evaluation done by DRE officers the "Drug Influence Evaluation", DIE.

DREs were developed by police officers from the Los Angeles Police Department in the early 1970s. The officers' drug recognition methods were officially recognized by the LAPD management in 1979, and adopted by the National Highway Traffic Safety Administration in the early 1980s.

Certification is issued by the International Association of Chiefs of Police (IACP).  To remain certified and in good standing, DREs must track their evaluations and enter the results into an online database.

DRE training 
DRE training and certification standards are defined by the International Association of Chiefs of Police  Training is available only to "a person ... in the employ and under the direct control of  a public criminal justice agency involved in the enforcement of criminal or traffic safety laws or an institution involved in providing training services to officers of law enforcement agencies.". IACP standards require DREs training to be done using an official Student Manual. This manual. is widely cited in court as defining standards for the performance of a Drug Influence Evaluation.

12-Step DRE process
A DIE involves the following 12 steps
  Breath Alcohol Test: The arresting officer reviews the subject's breath alcohol concentration (BrAC) test results and determines if the subject's apparent impairment is consistent with the subject's BrAC. If so, the officer will not normally call a DRE. If the impairment is not explained by the BrAC, the officer requests a DRE evaluation. 
  Interview of the arresting officer 
  Preliminary examination and first pulse 
  Eye examinations 
  Divided Attention Psychophysical Tests 
  Vital signs and second pulse
  Dark room examinations 
  Examination for muscle tone
  Check for injection sites and third pulse 
  Subject's Statements and Other Observations 
  Analysis and Opinions of the Evaluator 
  Toxicological examination: After completing the evaluation, the DRE normally requests a urine, blood and/or saliva sample from the subject for a toxicology lab analysis.

Critique & Controversy

Scientific validation 
Claims regarding the effectiveness of DREs have not been supported by research. These claims are critical to the admission of DRE expert testimony in criminal trials.

The DRE Student Manual identifies three scientific studies as being those that validate DRE testing. These studies are: Bigelow 1985 (aka the Johns Hopkins study); Compton 1986 (aka the LAPD-173 study); and Adler 1994 (aka the Arizona DRE Validation Study). However, all three of these studies have been shown to have major methodological flaws.

Admissibility 

In 2017, the Supreme Court of Canada held that "a DRE is a 'drug recognition expert', certified as such for the purposes of the 12 step evaluation. By reason of his training and experience, a DRE undoubtedly possesses expertise on determining drug impairment that is outside the experience and knowledge of the trier of fact. He is thus an expert for the purpose of applying the 12 step evaluation and determining whether that evaluation indicates drug impairment. His expertise has been conclusively and irrebuttably established by Parliament. Knowledge of the underlying science is not a precondition to the admissibility of a DRE’s opinion."

This mirrors US case law where testimony of police officers regarding alcohol impairment is admitted in court without the need for the officer to be an expert in, or to testify to, the underlying sciences of the sobriety tests they are trained to administer.

Police Handing Out Drugs 
On May 2, 2012, activists with Occupy Minneapolis released a documentary video called MK Occupy Minnesota. The video documents testimony from participants that police officers in Minneapolis gave them cannabis as part of a Drug Recognition Expert program.

See also
 Drug test
 Occupy Minneapolis

References

External links
 LAPD Drug Recognition Expert (DRE) Homepage
 Drug Recognition Expert Evaluations RCMP
 Drug Evaluation and Classification Program International Association of Chiefs of Police
 Drugs and Driving: When Science and Policy Don't Mix, Mark Asbridge, Canadian Journal of Public Health, Vol. 97,No. 4 (2006–07, pp. 283–285
 The Standardized Field Sobriety Tests: A Review of Scientific and Legal Issues, Steven J. Rubenzer, Law and Human Behavior, Vol. 32, No. 4 (Aug., 2008), pp. 293–313
 OccupyMN.org
 PaperRevolution.org

Law enforcement in the United States
Drug control law in the United States